Kyle David Hodnett (born 4 December 1986) is a South African born English cricketer. Hodnett is a left-handed batsman who bowls right-arm fast-medium. He was born in Durban, Natal.

Having been a part of the MCC Young Cricketers from 2005 to 2008, Hodnett made his List A debut for the Marylebone Cricket Club in 2008 against Bangladesh A at The Racecourse, Durham. In this match, Hodnett took the wicket of Naeem Islam in the Bangladesh A first-innings, conceding in the process 43 runs from 10 overs. With the bat, he scored 6 runs before being dismissed by Dolar Mahmud. Bangladesh A won the match by 80 runs. Also during the 2008 season, he took a Second XI Championship hat-trick against Northamptonshire II at Brunton Memorial Ground, Radlett, becoming the first MCC Young Cricketer to take a hat-trick in the Second XI Championship. Hodnett was included in Nottinghamshire's 2009 preseason plans but suffered a Patellar Tendinitis injury to his right knee, which ruled him out for the rest of the season.

In 2010, he made four Minor Counties Championship appearances for Berkshire against Wales Minor Counties, Cheshire, Shropshire and Cornwall.

He returned to his native South Africa where he made his First-Class debut for KwaZulu-Natal against Free State in the CSA Provincial Three-Day Competition 2011/12. During the 2012/13 season, he made his Twenty20 debut for KwaZulu-Natal against Griqualand West at Kingsmead Cricket Ground.

References

External links

1986 births
Living people
Berkshire cricketers
Cricketers from Durban
English cricketers
English sportspeople of South African descent
KwaZulu-Natal cricketers
Marylebone Cricket Club cricketers